Gilgit-Baltistan Disaster Management Authority (GBDMA) is an organization which deals with natural or man-made disasters in Gilgit-Baltistan, Pakistan. GBDMA's mandate is to engage in activities concerning to all four stages of Disaster Management Spectrum.

The GB Disaster Management Authority (GBDMA) was established in 2010 under the National Disaster Management Act, 2010.

See also 
 National Disaster Management Authority (Pakistan)
 Government of Gilgit-Baltistan
 FATA Disaster Management Authority
 State Disaster Management Authority (Azad Jammu & Kashmir)

References

External links
 Gilgit-Baltistan Disaster Management Authority on Facebook

Emergency management in Pakistan
Government agencies established in 2010
Government agencies of Gilgit-Baltistan
2010 establishments in Pakistan